The International Covenant on Economic, Social and Cultural Rights (ICESCR) is a multilateral treaty adopted by the United Nations General Assembly (GA) on 16 December 1966 through GA. Resolution 2200A (XXI), and came in force from 3 January 1976. It commits its parties to work toward the granting of economic, social, and cultural rights (ESCR) to the Non-Self-Governing and Trust Territories and individuals, including labour rights and the right to health, the right to education, and the right to an adequate standard of living. As of July 2020, the Covenant has 171 parties. A further four countries, including the United States, have signed but not ratified the Covenant.

The ICESCR (and its Optional Protocol) is part of the International Bill of Human Rights, along with the Universal Declaration of Human Rights (UDHR) and the International Covenant on Civil and Political Rights (ICCPR), including the latter's first and second Optional Protocols.

The Covenant is monitored by the UN Committee on Economic, Social and Cultural Rights.

Genesis
The ICESCR has its roots in the same process that led to the Universal Declaration of Human Rights. A "Declaration on the Essential Rights of Man" had been proposed at the 1945 San Francisco Conference which led to the founding of the United Nations, and the Economic and Social Council was given the task of drafting it. Early on in the process, the document was split into a declaration setting forth general principles of human rights, and a convention or covenant containing binding commitments. The former evolved into the UDHR and was adopted on 10 December 1948.

Drafting continued on the convention, but there remained significant differences between UN members on the relative importance of negative civil and political versus positive economic, social and cultural rights. These eventually caused the convention to be split into two separate covenants, "one to contain civil and political rights and the other to contain economic, social and cultural rights." The two covenants were to contain as many similar provisions as possible, and be opened for signature simultaneously. Each would also contain an article on the right of all peoples to self-determination.

The States Parties to the present Covenant, including those having responsibility for the administration of Non-Self-Governing and Trust Territories, shall promote the realisation of the right of self-determination, and shall respect that right, in conformity with the provisions of the Charter of the United Nations.

The first document became the International Covenant on Civil and Political Rights, and the second the International Covenant on Economic, Social and Cultural Rights. The drafts were presented to the UN General Assembly for discussion in 1954, and adopted in 1966.

Summary
The Covenant follows the structure of the UDHR and the ICCPR, with a preamble and thirty-one articles, divided into five parts.

Part 1 (Article 1) recognises the right of all peoples to self-determination, including the right to "freely determine their political status", pursue their economic, social and cultural goals, and manage and dispose of their own resources. It recognises a negative right of a people not to be deprived of its means of subsistence, and imposes an obligation on those parties still responsible for non-self governing and trust territories (colonies) to encourage and respect their self-determination.

Part 2 (Articles 2–5) establishes the principle of "progressive realisation" (see below.) It also requires the rights be recognised "without discrimination of any kind as to race, colour, sex, language, religion, political or other opinion, national or social origin, property, birth or other status". The rights can only be limited by law, in a manner compatible with the nature of the rights, and only for the purpose of "promoting the general welfare in a democratic society".

Part 3 (Articles 6–15) lists the rights themselves. These include rights to
 work, under "just and favourable conditions", with the right to form and join trade unions (Articles 6, 7, and 8);
 social security, including social insurance (Article 9);
 family life, including paid parental leave and the protection of children (Article 10);
 an adequate standard of living, including adequate food, clothing and housing, and the "continuous improvement of living conditions" (Article 11);
 health, specifically "the highest attainable standard of physical and mental health" (Article 12);
 education, including free universal primary education, generally available secondary education and equally accessible higher education. This should be directed to "the full development of the human personality and the sense of its dignity", and enable all persons to participate effectively in society (Articles 13 and 14);
 participation in cultural life (Article 15).

As negative and positive rights are rights that oblige either action (positive rights) or inaction (negative rights), many of these aforementioned rights include specific actions which must be undertaken to realise them, as they are positive economic, social and cultural rights that go beyond relatively inaction-based civil and political negative rights.

Part 4 (Articles 16–25) governs reporting and monitoring of the Covenant and the steps taken by the parties to implement it. It also allows the monitoring body – originally the United Nations Economic and Social Council – now the Committee on Economic, Social and Cultural Rights – see below – to make general recommendations to the UN General Assembly on appropriate measures to realise the rights (Article 21)

Part 5 (Articles 26–31) governs ratification, entry into force, and amendment of the Covenant.

Core provisions

Principle of progressive realisation
Article 2 of the Covenant imposes a duty on all parties to

take steps... to the maximum of its available resources, with a view to achieving progressively the full realization of the rights recognized in the present Covenant by all appropriate means, including particularly the adoption of legislative measures.

This is known as the principle of "progressive realisation". It acknowledges that some of the rights (for example, the right to health) may be difficult in practice to achieve in a short period of time, and that states may be subject to resource constraints, but requires them to act as best they can within their means.

The principle differs from that of the ICCPR, which obliges parties to "respect and to ensure to all individuals within its territory and subject to its jurisdiction" the rights in that Convention. However, it does not render the Covenant meaningless. The requirement to "take steps" imposes a continuing obligation to work towards the realisation of the rights. It also rules out deliberately regressive measures which impede that goal. The Committee on Economic, Social and Cultural Rights also interprets the principle as imposing minimum core obligations to provide, at the least, minimum essential levels of each of the rights. If resources are highly constrained, this should include the use of targeted programmes aimed at the vulnerable.

The Committee on Economic, Social and Cultural Rights regards legislation as an indispensable means for realizing the rights which is unlikely to be limited by resource constraints. The enacting of anti-discrimination provisions and the establishment of enforceable rights with judicial remedies within national legal systems are considered to be appropriate means. Some provisions, such as anti-discrimination laws, are already required under other human rights instruments, such as the ICCPR.

Labour rights

Article 6 of the Covenant recognizes the right to work as defined by the opportunity of everyone to gain a means of sustenance by means of freely chosen or accepted work. Parties are required to take "appropriate steps" to safeguard this right, including technical and vocational training and economic policies aimed at steady economic development, and ultimately full employment. The right implies parties must guarantee equal access to employment and protect workers from being unfairly deprived of employment. They must prevent discrimination in the workplace and ensure access for the disadvantaged. The fact that work must be freely chosen or accepted means parties must prohibit forced or child labour.

The work referred to in Article 6 must be decent work. This is effectively defined by Article 7 of the Covenant, which recognises the right of everyone to "just and favourable" working conditions. These are in turn defined as fair wages with equal pay for equal work, sufficient to provide a decent living for workers and their dependants; safe working conditions; equal opportunity in the workplace; and sufficient rest and leisure, including limited working hours and regular, paid holidays.

Article 8 recognises the right of workers to form or join trade unions and protects the right to strike. However, it allows these rights to be restricted for members of the armed forces, police, or government administrators. Several parties have placed reservations on this clause, allowing it to be interpreted in a manner consistent with their constitutions (e.g., China, Mexico), or extending the restriction of union rights to groups such as firefighters (e.g., Japan).

Right to social security

Article 9 of the Covenant recognises "the right of everyone to social security, including social insurance". It requires parties to provide some form of social insurance scheme to protect people against the risks of sickness, disability, maternity, employment injury, unemployment or old age; to provide for survivors, orphans, and those who cannot afford health care; and to ensure that families are adequately supported. Benefits from such a scheme must be adequate, accessible to all, and provided without discrimination. The Covenant does not restrict the form of the scheme, and both contributory and non-contributory schemes are permissible (as are community-based and mutual schemes).

The Committee on Economic, Social and Cultural Rights has noted persistent problems with the implementation of this right, with very low levels of access.

Several parties, including France and Monaco, have reservations allowing them to set residence requirements in order to qualify for social benefits. The Committee on Economic, Social and Cultural Rights permits such restrictions, provided they are proportionate and reasonable.

Right to family life

Article 10 of the Covenant recognises the family as "the natural and fundamental group unit of society", and requires parties to accord it "the widest possible protection and assistance". Parties must ensure that their citizens are free to establish families and that marriages are freely contracted and not forced. Parties must also provide paid leave or adequate social security to mothers before and after childbirth, an obligation which overlaps with that of Article 9. Finally, parties must take "special measures" to protect children from economic or social exploitation, including setting a minimum age of employment and barring children from dangerous and harmful occupations.

Right to an adequate standard of living

Article 11 recognises the right to an adequate standard of living. This includes, but is not limited to, the right to adequate food, clothing, housing, and "the continuous improvement of living conditions". It also creates an obligation on parties to work together to eliminate world hunger.

The right to adequate food, also referred to as the right to food, is interpreted as requiring "the availability of food in a quantity and quality sufficient to satisfy the dietary needs of individuals, free from adverse substances, and acceptable within a given culture". This must be accessible to all, implying an obligation to provide special programmes for the vulnerable. This must also ensure an equitable distribution of world food supplies in relation to need, taking into account the problems of food-importing and food-exporting countries.<ref>'ICESCR, Article 11, 2 (b)</ref> The right to adequate food also implies a right to water.

The right to adequate housing, also referred to as the right to housing, is "the right to live somewhere in security, peace and dignity." It requires "adequate privacy, adequate space, adequate security, adequate lighting and ventilation, adequate basic infrastructure and adequate location with regard to work and basic facilities – all at a reasonable cost." Parties must ensure security of tenure and that access is free of discrimination, and progressively work to eliminate homelessness. Forced evictions, defined as "the permanent or temporary removal against their will of individuals, families and/or communities from the homes and/or land which they occupy, without the provision of, and access to, appropriate forms of legal or other protection," are a prima facie violation of the Covenant.

The right to adequate clothing, also referred to as the right to clothing, has not been authoritatively defined and has received little in the way of academic commentary or international discussion. What is considered "adequate" has only been discussed in specific contexts, such as refugees, the disabled, the elderly, or workers.

Right to healthArticle 12 of the Covenant recognises the right of everyone to "the enjoyment of the highest attainable standard of physical and mental health". "Health" is understood not just as a right to be healthy, but as a right to control one's own health and body (including reproduction), and be free from interference such as torture or medical experimentation. States must protect this right by ensuring that everyone within their jurisdiction has access to the underlying determinants of health, such as clean water, sanitation, food, nutrition and housing, and through a comprehensive system of healthcare, which is available to everyone without discrimination, and economically accessible to all.Article 12.2 requires parties to take specific steps to improve the health of their citizens, including reducing infant mortality and improving child health, improving environmental and workplace health, preventing, controlling and treating epidemic diseases, and creating conditions to ensure equal and timely access to medical services for all. These are considered to be "illustrative, non-exhaustive examples", rather than a complete statement of parties' obligations.

The right to health is interpreted as requiring parties to respect women's reproductive rights, by not limiting access to contraception or "censoring, withholding or intentionally misrepresenting" information about sexual health. They must also ensure that women are protected from harmful traditional practices such as female genital mutilation.

The right to health is an inclusive right extending not only to timely and appropriate health care, but also to the underlying determinants of health, such as access to safe and potable water and adequate sanitation, an adequate supply of safe food, nutrition and housing, healthy occupational and environmental conditions.

Right to free educationArticle 13 of the Covenant recognises the right of everyone to free education (free for the primary level only, and "the progressive introduction of free education" for the secondary and higher levels). This is to be directed towards "the full development of the human personality and the sense of its dignity", and enable all persons to participate effectively in society. Education is seen both as a human right and as "an indispensable means of realizing other human rights", and so this is one of the longest and most important articles of the Covenant.Article 13.2 lists a number of specific steps parties are required to pursue to realise the right of education. These include the provision of free, universal and compulsory primary education, "generally available and accessible" secondary education in various forms (including technical and vocational training), and equally accessible higher education. All of these must be available to all without discrimination. Parties must also develop a school system (though it may be public, private, or mixed), encourage or provide scholarships for disadvantaged groups. Parties are required to make education free at all levels, either immediately or progressively; "[p]rimary education shall be compulsory and available free to all"; secondary education "shall be made generally available and accessible to all by every appropriate means, and in particular by the progressive introduction of free education"; and "[h]igher education shall be made equally accessible to all, on the basis of capacity, by every appropriate means, and in particular by the progressive introduction of free education".Articles 13.3 and 13.4 require parties to respect the educational freedom of parents by allowing them to choose and establish private educational institutions for their children, also referred to as freedom of education. They also recognise the right of parents to "ensure the religious and moral education of their children in conformity with their own convictions". This is interpreted as requiring public schools to respect the freedom of religion and conscience of their students, and as forbidding instruction in a particular religion or belief system unless non-discriminatory exemptions and alternatives are available.

The Committee on Economic, Social and Cultural Rights interpret the Covenant as also requiring states to respect the academic freedom of staff and students, as this is vital for the educational process. It also considers corporal punishment in schools to be inconsistent with the Covenant's underlying principle of the dignity of the individual.Article 14 of the Covenant requires those parties which have not yet established a system of free compulsory primary education to rapidly adopt a detailed plan of action for its introduction "within a reasonable number of years".

Right to participation in cultural lifeArticle 15 of the Covenant recognises the right of everyone to participate in cultural life, enjoy the benefits of scientific progress, and to benefit from the protection of the moral and material rights to any scientific discovery or artistic work they have created. The latter clause is sometimes seen as requiring the protection of intellectual property, but the Committee on Economic, Social and Cultural Rights interprets it as primarily protecting the moral rights of authors and "proclaim[ing] the intrinsically personal character of every creation of the human mind and the ensuing durable link between creators and their creations". It thus requires parties to respect the right of authors to be recognised as the creator of a work. The material rights are interpreted as being part of the right to an adequate standard of living, and "need not extend over the entire lifespan of an author."

Parties must also work to promote the conservation, development and diffusion of science and culture, "respect the freedom indispensable for scientific research and creative activity", and encourage international contacts and cooperation in these fields.

Reservations
A number of parties have made reservations and interpretative declarations to their application of the Covenant.Algeria interprets parts of Article 13, protecting the liberty of parents to freely choose or establish suitable educational institutions, so as not to "impair its right freely to organize its educational system."Bangladesh interprets the self-determination clause in Article 1 as applying in the historical context of colonialism. It also reserves the right to interpret the labour rights in Articles 7 and 8 and the non-discrimination clauses of Articles 2 and 3 within the context of its constitution and domestic law.Belgium interprets non-discrimination as to national origin as "not necessarily implying an obligation on States automatically to guarantee to foreigners the same rights as to their nationals. The term should be understood to refer to the elimination of any arbitrary behaviour but not of differences in treatment based on objective and reasonable considerations, in conformity with the principles prevailing in democratic societies."China restricts labour rights in Article 8 in a manner consistent with its constitution and domestic law.Egypt accepts the Covenant only to the extent it does not conflict with Islamic Sharia law. Sharia is "a primary source of legislation" under Article 2 of both the suspended 1973 Constitution and the 2011 Provisional Constitutional Declaration.France views the Covenant as subservient to the UN Charter. It also reserves the right to govern the access of aliens to employment, social security, and other benefits.India interprets the right of self-determination as applying "only to the peoples under foreign domination" and not to apply to peoples within sovereign nation-states. It also interprets the limitation of rights clause and the rights of equal opportunity in the workplace within the context of its constitution.Indonesia interprets the self-determination clause (Article 1) within the context of other international law and as not applying to peoples within a sovereign nation-state.Ireland reserves the right to promote the Irish language.Japan reserved the right not to be bound to progressively introduce free secondary and higher education, the right to strike for public servant and the remuneration on public holidays.Kuwait interprets the non-discrimination clauses of Articles 2 and 3 within its constitution and laws, and reserves the right to social security to apply only to Kuwaitis. It also reserves the right to forbid strikes.Mexico restricts the labour rights of Article 8 within the context of its constitution and laws.Monaco interprets the principle of non-discrimination on the grounds of national origin as "not necessarily implying an automatic obligation on the part of States to guarantee foreigners the same rights as their nationals", and reserves the right to set residence requirements on the rights to work, health, education, and social security.Myanmar has a general reservation to interpret "the right of self-determination" to not interfere with the established government or authorize any action to undermine the government. Additionally, the term does not apply to Section 10 of the Constitution of the Republic of the Union of Myanmar, 2008. Section 10 reads: "no part of the territory constituted in the union such as regions, states, union territories, and self-administered areas shall ever secede from the Union."New Zealand reserved the right not to apply Article 8 (the right to form and join trade unions) insofar as existing measures (which at the time included compulsory unionism and encouraged arbitration of disputes) were incompatible with it.Norway reserves the right to strike so as to allow for compulsory arbitration of some labour disputes.Pakistan has a general reservation to interpret the Covenant within the framework of its constitution.Thailand interprets the right to self-determination within the framework of other international law.Trinidad and Tobago reserves the right to restrict the right to strike of those engaged in essential occupations.Turkey will implement the Covenant subject to the UN Charter. It also reserves the right to interpret and implement the right of parents to choose and establish educational institutions in a manner compatible with its constitution.United Kingdom views the Covenant as subservient to the UN Charter. It made several reservations regarding its overseas territories.United States – Amnesty International writes that "The United States signed the Covenant in 1979 under the Carter administration but is not fully bound by it until it is ratified. For political reasons, the Carter administration did not push for the necessary review of the Covenant by the Senate, which must give its 'advice and consent' before the US can ratify a treaty. The Reagan and George H.W. Bush administrations took the view that economic, social, and cultural rights were not really rights but merely desirable social goals and therefore should not be the object of binding treaties. The Clinton Administration did not deny the nature of these rights but did not find it politically expedient to engage in a battle with Congress over the Covenant. The George W. Bush administration followed in line with the view of the previous Bush administration." The Obama Administration stated "The Administration does not seek action at this time" on the Covenant. The Heritage Foundation, a critical conservative think tank, argues that signing it would oblige the introduction of policies that it opposes such as universal health care.

Optional Protocol

The Optional Protocol to the International Covenant on Economic, Social and Cultural Rights is a side-agreement to the Covenant which allows its parties to recognise the competence of the Committee on Economic Social and Cultural Rights to consider complaints from individuals.

The Optional Protocol was adopted by the UN General Assembly on 10 December 2008. It was opened for signature on 24 September 2009, and as of January 2023 has been signed by 46 parties and ratified by 26. Having passed the threshold of required ratifications, it has entered into force on 5 May 2013.

Committee on Economic, Social and Cultural Rights

The Committee on Economic, Social and Cultural Rights' is a body of human rights experts tasked with monitoring the implementation of the Covenant. It consists of 18 independent human rights experts, elected for four-year terms, with half the members elected every two years.

Unlike other human rights monitoring bodies, the committee was not established by the treaty it oversees. Rather, it was established by the Economic and Social Council following the failure of two previous monitoring bodies.

All states parties are required to submit regular reports to the Committee outlining the legislative, judicial, policy and other measures they have taken to implement the rights affirmed in the Covenant. The first report is due within two years of ratifying the Covenant; thereafter reports are due every five years. The Committee examines each report and addresses its concerns and recommendations to the State party in the form of "concluding observations".

The Committee typically meets every May and November in Geneva.

 Parties to the covenant 
The following are parties to the covenant:

States not members of the Covenant
Signed but not ratified 

Neither signed nor ratified

 Andorra
 Botswana
 Bhutan
 Brunei
 Kiribati
 Malaysia
 Federated States of Micronesia
 Mozambique
 Nauru
 Oman
 Saint Kitts and Nevis
 Samoa
 Saudi Arabia
 Singapore
 St. Lucia
 South Sudan
 Tonga
 Tuvalu
 United Arab Emirates
 Vanuatu

Non-members of the UN
 Cook Islands
 Niue
 Taiwan
 Vatican City (through the Holy See)

Notes

References

External links

List of parties, UNTC
Committee on Economic, Social and Cultural Rights, the convention's monitoring body
International Network for Economic, Social and Cultural Rights
"Rights and Value: Construing the International Covenant on Economic, Social and Cultural Rights as Civil Commons"  by G. Baruchello & R.L. Johnstone, Studies in Social Justice, Vol 5, No 1 (2011): Special Issue: Life Value and Social Justice, 91–125
 Procedural history note and audiovisual material on the International Covenant on Economic, Social and Cultural Rights'' in the Historic Archives of the United Nations Audiovisual Library of International Law

Human rights instruments
United Nations treaties
Treaties concluded in 1966
Treaties entered into force in 1976
Treaties of the Democratic Republic of Afghanistan
Treaties of Albania
Treaties of Algeria
Treaties of the People's Republic of Angola
Treaties of Argentina
Treaties of Armenia
Treaties of Australia
Treaties of Austria
Treaties of Azerbaijan
Treaties of the Bahamas
Treaties of Bahrain
Treaties of Bangladesh
Treaties of Barbados
Treaties of the Byelorussian Soviet Socialist Republic
Treaties of Belgium
Treaties of Belize
Treaties of Benin
Treaties of Bolivia
Treaties of Bosnia and Herzegovina
Treaties of Brazil
Treaties of the People's Republic of Bulgaria
Treaties of Burkina Faso
Treaties of Burundi
Treaties of the People's Republic of Kampuchea
Treaties of Cameroon
Treaties of Canada
Treaties of Cape Verde
Treaties of the Central African Republic
Treaties of Chad
Treaties of Chile
Treaties of the People's Republic of China
Treaties of Colombia
Treaties of the Republic of the Congo
Treaties of Costa Rica
Treaties of Ivory Coast
Treaties of Croatia
Treaties of Cyprus
Treaties of the Czech Republic
Treaties of Czechoslovakia
Treaties of North Korea
Treaties of Zaire
Treaties of Denmark
Treaties of Djibouti
Treaties of Dominica
Treaties of the Dominican Republic
Treaties of Ecuador
Treaties of Egypt
Treaties of El Salvador
Treaties of Equatorial Guinea
Treaties of Eritrea
Treaties of Estonia
Treaties of the Transitional Government of Ethiopia
Treaties of Fiji
Treaties of Finland
Treaties of France
Treaties of Gabon
Treaties of the Gambia
Treaties of Georgia (country)
Treaties of West Germany
Treaties of East Germany
Treaties of Ghana
Treaties of Greece
Treaties of Grenada
Treaties of Guatemala
Treaties of Guinea
Treaties of Guinea-Bissau
Treaties of Guyana
Treaties of Haiti
Treaties of Honduras
Treaties of the Hungarian People's Republic
Treaties of Iceland
Treaties of India
Treaties of Indonesia
Treaties of Pahlavi Iran
Treaties of Ba'athist Iraq
Treaties of Ireland
Treaties of Israel
Treaties of Italy
Treaties of Jamaica
Treaties of Japan
Treaties of Jordan
Treaties of Kazakhstan
Treaties of Kenya
Treaties of Kuwait
Treaties of Kyrgyzstan
Treaties of Laos
Treaties of Latvia
Treaties of Lebanon
Treaties of Lesotho
Treaties of Liberia
Treaties of the Libyan Arab Republic
Treaties of Liechtenstein
Treaties of Lithuania
Treaties of Luxembourg
Treaties of Madagascar
Treaties of Malawi
Treaties of the Maldives
Treaties of Mali
Treaties of Malta
Treaties of the Marshall Islands
Treaties of Mauritania
Treaties of Mauritius
Treaties of Mexico
Treaties of Monaco
Treaties of the Mongolian People's Republic
Treaties of Montenegro
Treaties of Morocco
Treaties of Namibia
Treaties of Nepal
Treaties of the Netherlands
Treaties of New Zealand
Treaties of Nicaragua
Treaties of Niger
Treaties of Nigeria
Treaties of Norway
Treaties of Pakistan
Treaties of the State of Palestine
Treaties of Panama
Treaties of Papua New Guinea
Treaties of Paraguay
Treaties of Peru
Treaties of the Philippines
Treaties of the Polish People's Republic
Treaties of Portugal
Treaties of South Korea
Treaties of Moldova
Treaties of the Socialist Republic of Romania
Treaties of the Soviet Union
Treaties of Rwanda
Treaties of São Tomé and Príncipe
Treaties of San Marino
Treaties of Senegal
Treaties of Serbia and Montenegro
Treaties of Seychelles
Treaties of Sierra Leone
Treaties of Slovakia
Treaties of Slovenia
Treaties of the Solomon Islands
Treaties of the Somali Democratic Republic
Treaties of South Africa
Treaties of Spain
Treaties of Sri Lanka
Treaties of Saint Vincent and the Grenadines
Treaties of the Democratic Republic of the Sudan
Treaties of Suriname
Treaties of Eswatini
Treaties of Sweden
Treaties of Switzerland
Treaties of Syria
Treaties of Tajikistan
Treaties of Thailand
Treaties of North Macedonia
Treaties of East Timor
Treaties of Togo
Treaties of Trinidad and Tobago
Treaties of Tunisia
Treaties of Turkey
Treaties of Turkmenistan
Treaties of Uganda
Treaties of the Ukrainian Soviet Socialist Republic
Treaties of the United Kingdom
Treaties of Tanzania
Treaties of Uruguay
Treaties of Uzbekistan
Treaties of Venezuela
Treaties of Vietnam
Treaties of the Yemen Arab Republic
Treaties of Yugoslavia
Treaties of Zambia
Treaties of Zimbabwe
Art and culture treaties
1966 in New York City
Treaties adopted by United Nations General Assembly resolutions
Treaties extended to Bermuda
Treaties extended to the Cayman Islands
Treaties extended to the Falkland Islands
Treaties extended to Guernsey
Treaties extended to the Isle of Man
Treaties extended to Jersey
Treaties extended to Montserrat
Treaties extended to the Pitcairn Islands
Treaties extended to the Turks and Caicos Islands
Treaties extended to Saint Helena, Ascension and Tristan da Cunha
Treaties extended to Gibraltar
Treaties extended to the Netherlands Antilles
Treaties extended to Aruba
Treaties extended to the Faroe Islands
Treaties extended to Greenland
Treaties extended to Portuguese Macau
Treaties extended to British Honduras
Treaties extended to the Gilbert and Ellice Islands
Treaties extended to British Hong Kong
Treaties extended to West Berlin